Rudolf "Putte" Kock (29 June 1901 – 31 October 1979) was a Swedish football, ice hockey and bridge player who won a bronze medal in the 1924 Summer Olympics as a football player, being voted the best left winger after the tournament. He also made six caps for the Swedish ice hockey team, including the Ice Hockey European Championship 1922, and scored five goals.

After having to end his career prematurely due to a knee injury, he worked as a football coach with AIK's rivals Djurgården and with the national team (1943–1956). Together with George Raynor he qualified Sweden for the 1948 Summer Olympics where they won gold, the 1950 FIFA World Cup (bronze) and the 1952 Summer Olympics (bronze).

After his coaching career Kock became a famous and well liked sports commentator on Swedish television.

Bridge accomplishments
 World Team Championships (Bermuda Bowl)
Placed third representing Sweden and Iceland in 1950
Placed second representing Sweden in 1953
 European Team Championships
Placed first representing Sweden in 1939 and 1952
Placed second representing Sweden in 1948, 1949 and 1950

References

External links

 
 
 

1901 births
1979 deaths
Association football wingers
Swedish footballers
Swedish ice hockey players
Swedish contract bridge players
Footballers at the 1924 Summer Olympics
Olympic footballers of Sweden
Olympic bronze medalists for Sweden
AIK Fotboll players
AIK IF players
Sweden international footballers
Swedish football managers
Sweden national football team managers
Djurgårdens IF Fotboll managers
Olympic medalists in football
Medalists at the 1924 Summer Olympics
Sportspeople from Stockholm